Light Poles and Pine Trees is the third album from the southern hip hop duo Field Mob, and their first, and only, under the Disturbing tha Peace imprint. It was released in stores on June 20, 2006. Originally, the premiere single from the album was to be the track Friday Night but did not make the final album cut, although it was still released in early 2006 as a radio promo and appeared on international editions as an extra bonus track. Instead the first official single from the album was the Jazze Pha produced song "So What" featuring R&B singer Ciara. This has become the duo's most successful hit to date, climbing to #10 on the US Billboard Hot 100, and #3 and #4 on the US Hot Rap Tracks and US Hot R&B/Hip Hop Songs charts, respectively.

The album itself achieved #1 on the US Billboard Top Rap Albums and #7 on the US Billboard 200. It has sold over 200,000 copies.

The track "Georgia" is a reprise, originally appearing on the compilation Disturbing tha Peace.

Track listing
 "1, 2, 3" – 4:18                       
 "My Wheels" – 4:11                     
 "So What" (featuring Ciara) – 3:36          
 "Baby Bend Over" (featuring Polow da Don) – 3:48                
 "Smilin'" (featuring Ludacris) – 4:18       
 "Area Code 229" – 4:35                       
 "Blacker the Berry (Skit)" - 1:09
 "Blacker the Berry" – 4:25            
 "I Hate You" – 3:43
 "At the Park" – 3:40                   
 "Eat 'Em Up, Beat 'Em Up" – 4:59        
 "Pistol Grip" – 4:14                 
 "Sorry Baby" (featuring Bobby V) – 3:26
 "It's Over" – 3:32                     
 "Georgia" (featuring Jamie Foxx & Ludacris) – 4:23
 "Friday Night" (International Editions Only) - 3:45

Charts

Weekly charts

Year-end charts

References 

2006 albums
Field Mob albums
Albums produced by Jazze Pha
Albums produced by Polow da Don
Disturbing tha Peace albums